El circo is an album recorded by Mexican rock band Maldita Vecindad. The album was released on 24 September 1991 under the BMG Entertainment Mexico label.

Track listing 
All tracks by Maldita Vecindad

 "Pachuco" – 3:14
 "Un poco de sangre" – 4:00
 "Toño" – 3:30
 "Solín" – 3:11
 "Kumbala" – 4:27
 "Un gran circo" – 4:11
 "Pata de perro" – 3:29
 "Crudelia" – 2:42
 "Mare" – 3:38
 "Otra" – 0:17
 "Querida" – 3:29

Personnel 

 Roco – vocals
 Aldo – bass
 Pato – guitar
 Pacho – drums
 Sax – saxophones & guitar
 Lobito – percussion

1991 albums
Maldita Vecindad albums